Sorbus cashmiriana, the Kashmir rowan, is a species of flowering plant in the family Rosaceae, native to the western Himalayas, including Kashmir.

The bark is smooth grey or red-grey. The flowers are 7–10 mm in diameter, with five very pale pink petals and pale yellowish stamens, produced in corymbs in the spring. Pollination is by insects. The fruit is a white to whitish-pink pome 12–15 mm in diameter, ripening in the autumn and often persisting long after the leaf fall into winter.

Cultivation
It is a popular ornamental tree, grown for its clusters of white fruit. It has gained the Royal Horticultural Society's Award of Garden Merit.

References

cashmiriana